Claude Hobday (12 May 1872, Faversham, Kent – 10 March 1954, Surbiton, England) was an English double-bass player, a member of a well-known musical family, who took part in various early chamber-music recordings.

Biography

Early life
Claude Hobday was the younger brother of the violist Alfred Charles Hobday (1870–1942) and the brother-in-law of the pianist Ethel Hobday (née Sharpe).

He studied with A.C. White at the Royal College of Music in London from 1888-1892.

Career
He played in leading orchestras, including the Royal English Opera under Sir Arthur Sullivan, the Glasgow Choral Union under Augustus Manns, the Scottish Orchestra under George Henschel, in the Richter Concerts in London, in the London Symphony Orchestra as a founding member from 1904–10, in the Beecham Symphony Orchestra from 1910–16 and in the Royal Philharmonic Orchestra, before becoming a founder member of the BBC Symphony Orchestra in 1930. He retired from playing in 1940. He was professor of double-bass at the Royal College of Music from 1902–46, his pupils including Adrian Beers, Ernest Ineson and Francis Baines. He was a notable collector of basses, owning instruments by Testore, Montagnana, Gasparo da Salò, Gennaro Gagliano, and Vincenzo Panormo.

Hobday was a major chamber musician, appearing in the South Place Concerts for thirty five years.

Recordings
Hobday was a prolific recording artist. He appeared with members of the International Quartet (André Mangeot (violin), Frank Howard (viola) and Herbert Withers (cello)) and Wilhelm Backhaus (piano) in an early Austrian HMV recording of Schubert's Trout Quintet (GC ES 395/8, reissued in 1997 as CD Biddulph [England], LHW 038) (acoustically recorded).

He also appears with the Léner Quartet in the Columbia Records electric microphone recordings of the Beethoven Septet in E flat major and the (1928) Schubert Octet in F major, with Charles Draper (clarinet), E.W. Hinchliffe (bassoon) and Aubrey Brain (French horn).

For HMV, with the Quatuor Pro Arte, he recorded Mozart's Eine kleine Nachtmusik and, with Artur Schnabel at the piano, a second version of the Trout Quintet. He also played on the Busch Chamber Players' recordings of the Bach Brandenburg Concertos and Orchestral Suites and Mozart's Adagio and Fugue.

Sources
 Eaglefield-Hull, A. A Dictionary of Modern Music and Musicians, (Dent, London 1924).
 Forman, F. 'Acoustic Chamber Music Sets (1899–1926): A Discography,' Journal of the Association for Recorded Sound Collections, 3 parts: Vol 31, No. 1 (Spring 2000); 31, No. 2; 32, No. 1.
 Potter, T. 'Hobday's Heyday, Double Bassist, No.18, Autumn 2001, pp. 22–24.

English classical musicians
British double-bassists
Male double-bassists
1872 births
1954 deaths